General elections were held in Ecuador on 31 January 1988, with a second round of the presidential elections on 8 May. Rodrigo Borja Cevallos of the Democratic Left won the presidential elections, receiving 54% of the vote in the second round, whilst the Democratic Left remained the largest faction in the National Congress, winning 31 of the 72 seats.

Results

President

National Congress

References

Ecuador
Elections in Ecuador
1988 in Ecuador